Shuhei Aoyama (born December 5, 1984, in Ichihara, Chiba) is a former Grand Prix motorcycle road racer. He is the younger brother of MotoGP rider Hiroshi Aoyama.

He rode in the All-Japan Road Racing Championship until 2005, when he won the 250cc championship with Honda. He previously won the 125cc championship in 2003, also with Honda. He also rode a couple of events as wildcard rider in the Grand Prix World Championships during his stint in Japan.

After winning the 250cc championship in Japan, Aoyama secured a Grand Prix World Championships ride with Honda's 250cc factory team in 2006. He replaced his brother Hiroshi Aoyama, who moved to KTM. He scored his first podium finish with a third-place at Le Mans, finishing just ahead of his brother, Hiroshi. He finished the season eighth in overall standings with 99 points and was named as Rookie Of The Year for his performance in his debut season.  In 2007, he remained with the team, but he failed to improved on his rookie season. He failed to record a podium finish and finished the season 12th in overall standings. However, he recorded his first pole position in his home race at Motegi.

In 2008, he moved to World Superbike. He once again teamed up with Honda, riding a Honda CBR1000RR motorcycle with Alto Evolution Honda Superbike. However, he struggled to adapt with the bigger 1000 cc four-stroke bike and only managed two point-scoring position.

Aoyama was left without a permanent ride in 2009, but he made a return to 250cc Grand Prix World Championships as a wild-card rider in his home race at Motegi. He finished with a 6th place after starting from 17th on the grid.

It was not possible to find a contract for the 2010 season even though he wanted to aim for the world title. Aoyama announced his active service retirement on his own blog on February 8, 2010. Afterwards, he participated in the Japanese Auto Race series.

Career statistics

Grand Prix motorcycle racing

By season

Races by year
(key) (Races in bold indicate pole position, races in italics indicate fastest lap)

References

External links
Official website
Shuhei Aoyama on MotoGP.com

1984 births
Living people
Japanese motorcycle racers
People from Ichihara, Chiba
Superbike World Championship riders
250cc World Championship riders
Sportspeople from Chiba Prefecture